Okeechobee County Airport  is a general aviation airport located 3 mi (4.82 km) northwest of Okeechobee, in Okeechobee County, Florida.

History 
The airport was opened in April 1940 as Conners Field. It was leased by the United States Army Air Corps in 1941 as an auxiliary training field, and used by the Hendricks Army Airfield B-17 Flying Fortress training school near Sebring during World War II. The runways and other facilities were improved by the Army, and the airport was used for training touch-and-go landings landings and emergencies. No permanent military units or personnel were assigned. With the end of the war in 1945,  the site was returned for civil use.

Since then, Okeechobee has been operated as a general aviation airport.

See also

 Florida World War II Army Airfields

References 

 World War II airfields database: Florida

External links 
 

Airports in Florida
Airfields of the United States Army Air Forces in Florida
Transportation buildings and structures in Okeechobee County, Florida
1940 establishments in Florida
Airports established in 1940